Jaya Jaya Sankara International School is a CBSE school with an affiliation no. 1930178, located in Nazarathpet, Chennai, India.

History
The school was founded in the year 2001, under the guidance of  Sri Paramacharya Maha, Swami Sri Chandrasekharendra, Saraswathi Swamigal, Sri Jayendra Saraswathi swamigal and Sri Vijendra saraswathi Swamigal  under Kanchi Kamakoti Mutt . currently the school is  operating officially under the trust/society Jaya Mata Charitable Trust. This school is affiliated to CBSE for 1- 10 th standard and 11 - 12 is affiliated to State board.

Activities

Club Activities 

Following Club teams are available in the school
 Eco Club 
 Health and Wellness Club 
 Steve Job Computer Club 
 Literary Club 
 AEP 
 Maths Club 
 Disaster Management Club are the various club activities performed by the Department.

Special Activities 
Apart from Club teams, focus is provided on various other activities to enrich students skills. Some of the activities  are listed below

 MASS BAJAN
 YOGA
 VOLLEY BALL
 ART & CRAFT

References

External links

Schools in Chennai
Educational institutions established in 2001
2001 establishments in Tamil Nadu